Opuntia pottsii is a species of flowering plant in the family Cactaceae, native to Arizona, New Mexico and Texas in the United States and to northeast Mexico. It was first described by Joseph zu Salm-Reifferscheidt-Dyck in 1850.

References

pottsii
Flora of Arizona
Flora of New Mexico
Flora of Texas
Flora of Northeastern Mexico
Plants described in 1850